Monica Beltran (born 1985) is a soldier in the Virginia Army National Guard who was awarded the Bronze Star Medal with "V" device for actions during a 2005 battle in the Iraq War.

Early life and education
Born in 1985, Beltran is from Prince William County, Virginia. Her mother is Luz Washington. Beltran lived in the Elizabeth, New Jersey area before moving to Northern Virginia, where she graduated from Gar-Field Senior High School.

Career
As a teenager in February 2003, Beltran enlisted in the Virginia Army National Guard, primarily for the supplementary tuition assistance.

In late October 2005, Beltran was in Iraq as part of the 1173rd Transportation Company. She had been in Iraq for over 10 months by that point and was nearing the end of their mission; her unit's primary duty was providing armed escort for convoys of military vehicles in the country. While heading to a nearby forward operating base (for the first time) on October 26, 2005, Beltran and several other soldiers from her unit were ambushed by enemy forces using hand grenades, small arms fire, and rocket-propelled grenades. Ranked private first class at the time, she helped fight off the attack as a vehicle turret gunner, providing suppressing fire with a .50 caliber machine gun, despite suffering (unbeknownst to Beltran at the time) a bullet wound to her left hand in the process. Beltran's vehicle was hit by enemy fire, including rocket-propelled grenades, injuring the driver. Fellow soldier James Witkowski, one of Beltran's friends, was killed in the ambush, and 5 other soldiers were injured. Beltran's actions helped save 54 other soldiers from suffering serious injury. As a result of continuing to fight against the enemy even while injured, Beltran was awarded the Bronze Star Medal with "V" device, along with a Purple Heart (for her injury), and promoted to specialist. Several other soldiers also received Bronze Star Medals for valor; the soldier who was killed posthumously received a Silver Star. The entire battle lasted approximately 30 minutes. In October 2006, Beltran was promoted to sergeant.

In 2006, Beltran also worked for Lockheed Martin as a dispatcher. She served with the XVIII Airborne Corps and was deployed to Afghanistan in 2013.

Personal life
In 2006, Beltran lived in Lorton, Virginia. She has a younger sister who was in kindergarten in 2006. In 2012, Beltran was given the Virginia Women in History award by the Library of Virginia.

Awards and decorations

See also

Monica Lin Brown
Leigh Ann Hester

References

External links

1985 births
Living people
Virginia National Guard personnel
People from Lorton, Virginia
Women in the Iraq War